The stargazing minnow (Phenacobius uranops) is a North American species of freshwater cyprinid fish. It is distributed in the Green, Cumberland and Tennessee River drainages in Kentucky, Virginia, Tennessee, Georgia and Alabama.

This fish is generally about 8 cm long, and grows to 12 cm at most. It is common and abundant and not considered to be threatened.

References

Phenacobius
Taxa named by Edward Drinker Cope
Fish described in 1867